A general election was held in the U.S. state of Oregon on November 8, 2022. Primary elections were held on May 17, 2022.

Federal

United States Senate 

Incumbent Democratic Senator Ron Wyden won re-election to a fifth term. Wyden was first elected in a 1996 special election and reelected in 1998, 2004, 2010, and 2016.

Six other candidates, including Republican nominee Jo Rae Perkins, ran.

United States House of Representatives 
All five of Oregon's seats in the United States House of Representatives were up for re-election in 2022, as well as a sixth seat it gained due to the 2020 census. These seats were represented by four Democrats and one Republican.

Governor 

Incumbent Democratic Governor Kate Brown took office on February 18, 2015 upon the resignation of John Kitzhaber. She was subsequently elected in the gubernatorial special election in 2016 and was re-elected to a full term in 2018. She is term-limited and cannot seek re-election to a second full term until 2026.

An unprecedented 34 candidates ran in the primary elections with the eventual nominees being Democrat Tina Kotek, former speaker of the Oregon House of Representatives, and Republican Christine Drazan, the former minority leader of the Oregon House of Representatives. Former Democratic state Senator Betsy Johnson is running as an Independent. Other notable candidates included State Treasurer Tobias Read (D), former state Representative Bob Tiernan (R), Republican nominee in 2016 Bud Pierce, and Sandy Mayor Stan Pulliam (R). Pulitzer Prize-winning journalist Nicholas Kristof announced a run, but was declared ineligible by the Oregon Secretary of State's office, due to the state's residency requirements.

Labor Commissioner 
Incumbent Val Hoyle decided not to run for a second term, instead running for Oregon's 4th congressional district which was being vacated by retiring incumbent Peter DeFazio. Since the commissioner of labor is a nonpartisan role, a general election is only held in the event that no one in the primary election secures 50% of the vote.

Five candidates ran in the primary, with civil rights attorney Christina Stephenson and former state Representative Cheri Helt facing off in a runoff election. Stephenson defeated Helt.

Legislature 

All 60 seats in the Oregon House of Representatives were up for election, and 15 of 30 seats Oregon State Senate were be up for election in 2022.

Ballot measures 
Measure 111 amends the Oregon Constitution to add a right to healthcare.

Measure 112 amends the Oregon Constitution to remove slavery as a punishment for crime.

Measure 113 amends the Oregon Constitution to disqualify legislators with ten unexcused absences from serving their next term.

Measure 114 changes Oregon state statute regarding firearm ownership and purchase requirements.

References 

 
Oregon
Oregon elections by year